RAF Belton Park was established in 1942 as the Royal Air Force Regiment Depot, for training RAF Regiment personnel in airfield defence. The site of the Depot was on farmland on the opposite side of Londonthorpe Lane from the Park.

History

As early as the 1920s the RAF had formed small airfield defence units but traditionally the role of ground defence had predominantly been handled by detachments of regular army personnel. In the Second World War it became evident in the aftermath of the Dunkirk evacuation that the army did not have the resources, personnel or expertise to continue supporting the growing number of UK and overseas RAF airfields and the decision was taken to form a dedicated RAF defence force.

In January 1942 King George VI signed a Royal Warrant for "a Corps formed as an integral part of the RAF", and the RAF Regiment was born.

The first Depot was opened in RAF Hunmanby Moor with instructional staff seconded from the Brigade of Guards and the Royal Marines. The Depot moved to Belton Park in 1942.

During the First World War Belton Park had been a training centre for the Machine Gun Corps  and had housed and trained 18,000 men. During the First World War the hundreds of temporary wooden huts had been built over the Belton Park Golf Course's fairways and a highly detailed map of the site remains on display in the current golf course clubhouse.

RAF Belton Park closed in 1946 and the headquarters and depot of the RAF Regiment were combined and relocated to RAF Catterick where they remained until 1994 when they relocated to its current home at RAF Honington.

Belton Park today
In 1946 the site was converted into temporary housing, and named Alma Park Estate. The former NAAFI block was converted into a primary school.

The houses and school have been demolished, and the site is now an industrial estate.

See also
List of former Royal Air Force stations
RAF Regiment
Belton House

References

External links
RAF Regiment Belton

Royal Air Force stations in Lincolnshire
Military units and formations established in 1942
Military units and formations disestablished in 1946